The 65th Annual Tony Awards was held on June 12, 2011 to recognize achievement in Broadway productions during the 2010–2011 season.  They were held at the Beacon Theatre, ending a fourteen-year tradition of holding the ceremony at Radio City Music Hall. The Awards ceremony was broadcast live on CBS and was hosted by Neil Patrick Harris. The award nominations were announced on May 3, 2011.

The ceremony received extremely positive reviews from critics, with many citing it as a major improvement over the previous year. Numerous critics credited host Neil Patrick Harris with the success of the production, with one critic calling him "America's next great awards host."

Eligibility
Shows that opened during the 2010–11 Broadway season before April 28, 2011 were eligible. The category of "Lead Actress in a Musical" has only four nominees. According to Tony Award rules, "Because only six actresses are eligible for nomination in the Best Performance by an Actress in a Leading Role in a Musical category, only four of those actors can be nominated."

Ceremony
In addition to the CBS television broadcast, the ceremony was simulcast live to Times Square and included the Tony Awards Red Carpet and the complete Tony Awards show, including the Creative Arts Awards.

The creative arts awards presentation was hosted by Laura Benanti and Katie Finneran and were presented prior to the network broadcast of the rest of the awards and the entertainment. The awards in this portion of the ceremony included those for Best Original Score, Choreography, Best Orchestrations, and others.
 
Presenters at the ceremony included Daniel Radcliffe, Catherine Zeta-Jones, Whoopi Goldberg, Chris Rock, Alec Baldwin, Samuel L. Jackson, Kelsey Grammer, Viola Davis, John Leguizamo, Vanessa Redgrave, James Earl Jones, Harry Connick, Jr., Christie Brinkley, David Hyde Pierce, Marg Helgenberger, Matthew Broderick, Angela Lansbury, Jim Parsons, Robert Morse, Joel Grey, Patrick Wilson, Brooke Shields and Robin Williams.

Neil Patrick Harris, with costumed dancers and singers, opened the show with a comic and edgy number "arguing that Broadway, with its con artists, Mormons and nuns this season, is 'not just for gays anymore.'" The song was written by David Javerbaum and Adam Schlesinger.  Harris and Hugh Jackman performed another comic number as rival awards-show hosts.  Performances from nominated musicals included: Catch Me If You Can with Norbert Leo Butz and Aaron Tveit; Sister Act with Patina Miller; The Book of Mormon with Andrew Rannells; The Scottsboro Boys with Joshua Henry; Anything Goes with Sutton Foster; and How to Succeed in Business Without Really Trying with Daniel Radcliffe and John Laroquette. Other musical numbers were performed from Memphis, Spider-Man: Turn Off the Dark, Priscilla Queen of the Desert and Company.

Harris ended the broadcast with a rap-style recap of the show. The rap was notable because Lin-Manuel Miranda and Thomas Kail wrote the lyrics during the show—in 80 minutes while writing backstage, Miranda and Kail created all the lyrics, and Harris, aided by a teleprompter, learned and performed the rap without rehearsal.

Special awards
The Tony Awards Administration Committee announced special non-competitive awards prior to the ceremony. The Tony Award for Lifetime Achievement in the Theatre is given to Athol Fugard and Philip J. Smith, Chairman of The Shubert Organization. The Isabelle Stevenson Award is awarded to Eve Ensler, founder of V-Day. The Tony Honors for Excellence in Theatre is given to animal trainer William Berloni, The Drama Book Shop (West 40th Street in Manhattan), and Sharon Jensen and Alliance for Inclusion in the Arts. The Special Tony Award is given to Handspring Puppet Company, "for creating lifelike horses (manipulated by three actor-puppeteers)". The Regional Theatre Tony Award is presented to Lookingglass Theatre Company (Chicago, Illinois).

Competitive awards
Source: Tony Awards

Summary
The Book of Mormon received 14 nominations, the most of any production, and won nine, including Best Musical; The Scottsboro Boys received 12 nominations, winning none. The revival of  Anything Goes won three awards, including Best Revival of a Musical.  War Horse won five awards, including Best Play.  The Normal Heart won three awards, including Best Revival of a Play.  Several director-choreographers were double-nominated: Rob Ashford, Kathleen Marshall, Casey Nicholaw and Susan Stroman were nominated for both Best Director and Best Choreographer. Marshall (Choreography) and Nicholaw (Best Direction of a Musical with Trey Parker) won. The revival of The Merchant of Venice received seven nominations, the most for any play, but won none, followed by Jerusalem with six, winning one, for Best Actor, for the performance of Mark Rylance.

Awards
Winners are listed first and highlighted in boldface.

{| class=wikitable width="95%"
|-
! style="background:#C0C0C0;" ! width="50%" | Best Play
! style="background:#C0C0C0;" ! width="50%" | Best Musical
|-
| valign="top" |
 War Horse – Nick Stafford
 Good People – David Lindsay-Abaire
 Jerusalem – Jez Butterworth
 The Motherfucker with the Hat – Stephen Adly Guirgis
| valign="top" |
 The Book of Mormon Catch Me If You Can The Scottsboro Boys Sister Act|-
! style="background:#C0C0C0;" ! style="width="50%" | Best Revival of a Play
! style="background:#C0C0C0;" ! style="width="50%" | Best Revival of a Musical
|-
| valign="top" |
 The Normal Heart Arcadia The Importance of Being Earnest The Merchant of Venice| valign="top" |
 Anything Goes How to Succeed in Business Without Really Trying|-
! style="background:#C0C0C0;" ! style="width="50%" | Best Performance by a Leading Actor in a Play
! style="background:#C0C0C0;" ! style="width="50%" | Best Performance by a Leading Actress in a Play
|-
| valign="top" |
 Mark Rylance – Jerusalem as Johnny "Rooster" Byron
 Brian Bedford – The Importance of Being Earnest as Lady Bracknell
 Bobby Cannavale – The Motherfucker with the Hat as Jackie
 Joe Mantello – The Normal Heart as Ned Weeks
 Al Pacino – The Merchant of Venice as Shylock
| valign="top" |
 Frances McDormand – Good People as Margie Walsh
 Nina Arianda – Born Yesterday as Emma 'Billie' Dawn
 Lily Rabe – The Merchant of Venice as Portia
 Vanessa Redgrave – Driving Miss Daisy as Daisy Werthan
 Hannah Yelland – Brief Encounter as Laura Jesson
|-
! style="background:#C0C0C0;" ! style="width="50%" | Best Performance by a Leading Actor in a Musical
! style="background:#C0C0C0;" ! style="width="50%" | Best Performance by a Leading Actress in a Musical
|-
| valign="top" |
 Norbert Leo Butz – Catch Me If You Can as Carl Hanratty
 Josh Gad – The Book of Mormon as Elder Cunningham
 Joshua Henry – The Scottsboro Boys as Haywood Patterson
 Andrew Rannells – The Book of Mormon as Elder Price
 Tony Sheldon – Priscilla, Queen of the Desert as Bernadette
| valign="top" |
 Sutton Foster – Anything Goes as Reno Sweeney
 Beth Leavel – Baby It's You! as Florence Greenberg
 Patina Miller – Sister Act as Deloris Van Cartier
 Donna Murphy – The People in the Picture as Bubbie/Raisel
|-
! style="background:#C0C0C0;" ! style="width="50%" | Best Performance by a Featured Actor in a Play
! style="background:#C0C0C0;" ! style="width="50%" | Best Performance by a Featured Actress in a Play
|-
| valign="top" |
 John Benjamin Hickey – The Normal Heart as Felix Turner
 Mackenzie Crook – Jerusalem as Ginger
 Billy Crudup – Arcadia as Bernard Nightingale
 Arian Moayed – Bengal Tiger at the Baghdad Zoo as Musa
 Yul Vázquez – The Motherfucker with the Hat as Cousin Julio
| valign="top" |
 Ellen Barkin – The Normal Heart as Dr. Emma Brookner
 Edie Falco – The House of Blue Leaves as Bananas
 Judith Light – Lombardi as Marie Lombardi
 Joanna Lumley – La Bête as The Princess
 Elizabeth Rodriguez – The Motherfucker with the Hat as Veronica
|-
! style="background:#C0C0C0;" ! style="width="50%" | Best Performance by a Featured Actor in a Musical
! style="background:#C0C0C0;" ! style="width="50%" | Best Performance by a Featured Actress in a Musical
|-
| valign="top" |
 John Larroquette – How to Succeed in Business Without Really Trying as J.B. Biggley
 Colman Domingo – The Scottsboro Boys as Mr. Bones
 Adam Godley – Anything Goes as Lord Evelyn Oakleigh
 Forrest McClendon – The Scottsboro Boys as Mr. Tambo
 Rory O'Malley – The Book of Mormon as Elder McKinley
| valign="top" |
 Nikki M. James – The Book of Mormon as Nabulungi Hatimbi
 Laura Benanti – Women on the Verge of a Nervous Breakdown as Candela
 Tammy Blanchard – How to Succeed in Business Without Really Trying as Hedy La Rue
 Victoria Clark – Sister Act as Mother Superior
 Patti LuPone – Women on the Verge of a Nervous Breakdown as Lucia
|-
! style="background:#C0C0C0;" ! style="width="50%" | Best Book of a Musical
! style="background:#C0C0C0;" ! style="width="50%" | Best Original Score (Music and/or Lyrics) Written for the Theatre
|-
| valign="top" |
 Trey Parker, Robert Lopez and Matt Stone – The Book of Mormon
 Alex Timbers – Bloody Bloody Andrew Jackson David Thompson – The Scottsboro Boys Cheri Steinkellner, Bill Steinkellner and Douglas Carter Beane – Sister Act| valign="top" |
 The Book of Mormon – Trey Parker, Robert Lopez and Matt Stone (music and lyrics) The Scottsboro Boys – John Kander and Fred Ebb (music and lyrics)
 Sister Act – Alan Menken (music) and Glenn Slater (lyrics)
 Women on the Verge of a Nervous Breakdown – David Yazbek (music and lyrics)
|-
! style="background:#C0C0C0;" ! style="width="50%" | Best Scenic Design of a Play
! style="background:#C0C0C0;" ! style="width="50%" | Best Scenic Design of a Musical
|-
| valign="top" |
 Rae Smith – War Horse Todd Rosenthal – The Motherfucker with the Hat Ultz – Jerusalem Mark Wendland – The Merchant of Venice| valign="top" |
 Scott Pask – The Book of Mormon
 Beowulf Boritt – The Scottsboro Boys Derek McLane – Anything Goes Donyale Werle – Bloody Bloody Andrew Jackson|-
! style="background:#C0C0C0;" ! style="width="50%" | Best Costume Design of a Play
! style="background:#C0C0C0;" ! style="width="50%" | Best Costume Design of a Musical
|-
| valign="top" |
 Desmond Heeley – The Importance of Being Earnest
 Jess Goldstein – The Merchant of Venice Mark Thompson – La Bête Catherine Zuber – Born Yesterday| valign="top" |
 Tim Chappel and Lizzy Gardiner – Priscilla, Queen of the Desert
 Martin Pakledinaz – Anything Goes Ann Roth – The Book of Mormon Catherine Zuber – How to Succeed in Business Without Really Trying|-
! style="background:#C0C0C0;" ! style="width="50%" | Best Lighting Design of a Play
! style="background:#C0C0C0;" ! style="width="50%" | Best Lighting Design of a Musical
|-
| valign="top" |
 Paule Constable – War Horse
 David Lander – Bengal Tiger at the Baghdad Zoo Kenneth Posner – The Merchant of Venice Mimi Jordan Sherin – Jerusalem| valign="top" |
 Brian MacDevitt – The Book of Mormon
 Ken Billington – The Scottsboro Boys Howell Binkley – How to Succeed in Business Without Really Trying Peter Kaczorowski – Anything Goes|-
! style="background:#C0C0C0;" ! style="width="50%" | Best Sound Design of a Play
! style="background:#C0C0C0;" ! style="width="50%" | Best Sound Design of a Musical
|-
| valign="top" |
 Christopher Shutt – War Horse
 Acme Sound Partners and Cricket S. Myers – Bengal Tiger at the Baghdad Zoo Simon Baker – Brief Encounter Ian Dickinson for Autograph – Jerusalem| valign="top" |
 Brian Ronan – The Book of Mormon
 Peter Hylenski – The Scottsboro Boys Steve Canyon Kennedy – Catch Me If You Can Brian Ronan – Anything Goes|-
! style="background:#C0C0C0;" ! style="width="50%" | Best Direction of a Play
! style="background:#C0C0C0;" ! style="width="50%" | Best Direction of a Musical
|-
| valign="top" |
 Marianne Elliott and Tom Morris – War Horse
 Joel Grey and George C. Wolfe – The Normal Heart Anna D. Shapiro – The Motherfucker with the Hat Daniel J. Sullivan – The Merchant of Venice| valign="top" |
 Casey Nicholaw and Trey Parker – The Book of Mormon
 Rob Ashford – How to Succeed in Business Without Really Trying Kathleen Marshall – Anything Goes Susan Stroman – The Scottsboro Boys|-
! style="background:#C0C0C0;" ! style="width="50%" | Best Choreography
! style="background:#C0C0C0;" ! style="width="50%" | Best Orchestrations
|-
| valign="top" |
 Kathleen Marshall – Anything Goes
 Rob Ashford – How to Succeed in Business Without Really Trying Casey Nicholaw – The Book of Mormon Susan Stroman – The Scottsboro Boys| valign="top" |
 Larry Hochman and Stephen Oremus – The Book of Mormon
 Doug Besterman – How to Succeed in Business Without Really Trying Larry Hochman – The Scottsboro Boys Marc Shaiman and Larry Blank – Catch Me If You Can|}

Productions with multiple nominations and awards
The following 21 productions received multiple nominations (the number of nominations is shown at left):

14: The Book of Mormon
12: The Scottsboro Boys
9: Anything Goes8: How to Succeed in Business Without Really Trying7: The Merchant of Venice6: Jerusalem and The Motherfucker with the Hat5: The Normal Heart, Sister Act and War Horse
4: Catch Me if You Can
3: Bengal Tiger at the Baghdad Zoo, The Importance of Being Earnest and Women on the Verge of a Nervous Breakdown
2: Arcadia, Bloody Bloody Andrew Jackson, Born Yesterday, Brief Encounter, Good People, La Bête and Priscilla, Queen of the Desert

The following four productions received multiple awards (the number is shown at left):

9: The Book of Mormon
5: War Horse
3: Anything Goes and The Normal Heart''

In Memoriam

Arthur Laurents
Michael Langham
Michael Gough
Ellen Stewart
James Gammon
Marcia Lewis Bryan
Jill Clayburgh
Sidney Michaels
Hillard Elkins
Betty Garrett
Tom Bosley
Pam Gems
Israel Hicks
Shannon Tavarez
Douglas Leeds
Marian Mercer
Patricia Neal
Arthur Penn
Beverley Randolph
John Willis
Elizabeth Taylor
Jerry Bock
Theoni V. Aldredge
Philip Rose
Romulus Linney
John Cossette
Sandy Speer
Sada Thompson
Helen Stenborg
Randall Wreghitt
Lanford Wilson
Joseph Stein

See also
 Drama Desk Awards
 2011 Laurence Olivier Awards – equivalent awards for West End theatre productions
 Obie Award
 New York Drama Critics' Circle
 Theatre World Award
 Lucille Lortel Awards

References

External links
 Tony Awards Official Site
 Beacon Theatre - Official Web Site - New York City

2011 theatre awards
Tony Awards ceremonies
2011 awards in the United States
2011 in New York City
2010s in Manhattan
Television shows directed by Glenn Weiss